New Media for a New Millennium (NM2) was a three-year-long, European Union-sponsored project, began in 2004, that aimed at creating software tools intend to ease editing of media content.  The project ended in August 2007.

References

Further reading
 BBC: An article that covers NM2 background, objectives and participants
 Another essay on the project
 Another version of the article

External links 
 Projects website
 Project newsletters (six)

Media players
Graphics software